Vayuraptor (meaning "wind thief") is a genus of basal coelurosaurian theropod dinosaur that lived in the Early Cretaceous (Barremian) Sao Khua Formation of Thailand. The genus contains a single species, V. nongbualamphuensis, known from a partial skeleton.

Discovery 
The holotype and referred specimens of Vayuraptor (stored in the Sirindhorn Museum under the Department of Mineral Resources) were discovered in 1988 by Paladej Srisuk at Phu Wat Site A1, Nong Bua Lamphu Province, Thailand. The generic name means "wind thief", named after the Hindu god of wind Vayu and the Latin word raptor, which means thief. This name was chosen because Vayuraptor possesses a long and gracile , which suggests it was very fast and agile. The specific name is named after the province Vayuraptor was found in (Nong Bua Lamphu Province).

Description 
The holotype of Vayuraptor was inferred to be a mature individual, based on the fusion of its astragalus and calcaneum. As a possible megaraptoran, Vayuraptor would have had a long snout, large claws, light body, and long slender legs.

The elements which correspond to the forelimb of Vayuraptor are very fragmentary. The posteroventral (runs from the rear to the bottom) process of the coracoid tapers from the back of the coracoid to the bottom due to breakage. The bottom of the coracoid is expanded beyond the rim of the glenoid facet. The infraglenoid groove is absent from the coracoid. The distal (farther from the body) part of a manual phalanx is preserved. It does not have distinct extensor pits on the upper surface proximal (closer to the body) to the distal articulation surface, which is a trait only found in coelurosaurs. Part of the pubis is preserved, and the morphology of the pubic shaft is generally similar to other theropods, such as Neovenator.

Paleoenvironment 
With the first fossils of the genus being discovered in the Sao Khua Formation, Vayuraptor possibly shared its habitat with the dinosaurs Phuwiangvenator (which was also named in the same paper as Vayuraptor), Kinnareemimus, Siamosaurus, Siamotyrannus and Phuwiangosaurus.

References 

Prehistoric coelurosaurs
Barremian life
Early Cretaceous dinosaurs of Asia
Cretaceous Thailand
Fossils of Thailand
Fossil taxa described in 2019